Widok (meaning "view" in Polish) may refer to:
Widok, Masovian Voivodeship
Widok, Opole Voivodeship
Widok, Szczecin